The acronym NSK has several meanings:

 Neue Slowenische Kunst, a Slovenian art collective also known for its NSK state
 Japan Sumo Association, Nihon Sumo Kyokai
 Japan Newspaper Publishers and Editors Association, "Nihon Shinbun Kyokai"
 NSK Ltd., a Japanese bearing manufacturer
NSK Trade City, a retail and wholesaler chain based in Malaysia
 N. S. Krishnan, Tamil film comedian
 NonStop Kernel, operating system for the NonStop fault tolerant computers, formerly from Tandem Computers, now a product line of Hewlett Packard Enterprise
 IATA airport code for Alykel Airport
 Nuselský SK, Czech association football club founded in 1909 as NSK
 National and University Library Zagreb (Nacionalna i sveučilišna knjižnica)
 Niihau School of Kekaha
 Norra Skåne, Swedish newspaper
 Novosibirsk, one of the largest cities in Russia